Kiul Junction railway station (station code: KIUL), is one of the major railway junctions in Danapur division of East Central Railway.  Kiul is connected to metropolitan areas of India, by the Howrah–Delhi main line via Mugalsarai–Patna route which runs along the historic  Grand Trunk Road. The Danapur railway division's main line crosses Sahibganj loop line at the Kiul Junction. 
The Gaya–Kiul line also starts from the Kiul Junction.

Kiul is located on the bank of Kiul River in Lakhisarai district in the Indian state of Bihar. This is the place where Mahavira, Tirthankara of Jainism, achieved Kevala Jnana. The Kiul railway station is on Howrah–Delhi main line. Most of the Patna, Gaya, Bhagalpur, Barauni and Howrah bound express trains coming from Howrah, Sealdah, Ranchi and Tatanagar stop here.  Kiul junction is a busy station in East Bihar and entry station of East Central Railway and Eastern Railway.  There are five routes in the Station:  Gaya, Barauni, Bhagalpur, Howrah and Patna.

History

Facilities 
The major facilities available are waiting rooms, computerized reservation facility, Vehicle parking. The vehicles are allowed to enter the station premises. The station also has STD/ISD/PCO telephone booth, toilets, tea stall and book stall. Automatic ticket vending machines have been installed to reduce the queue for train tickets on the station.

Platforms

There are 6 platforms here And 2 New other Platforms Under construction Complite at February 2022. The platforms are interconnected with foot overbridge (FOB)towards JMP and Subway .

Nearest airport
The nearest airport to Kiul station are
Gaya Airport 
Lok Nayak Jayaprakash Airport, Patna 
Birsa Munda Airport, Ranchi  
Netaji Subhas Chandra Bose International Airport, Kolkata

See also 

Lakhisarai
Barauni
East Central Railway zone

References

External links 
 Kiul Junction Map
 Official website of the Lakhisarai district

Railway stations in Lakhisarai district
Railway junction stations in Bihar
Danapur railway division
Railway stations opened in 1864